Synaptotagmin-6 is a protein that in humans is encoded by the SYT6 gene.

Function 

Synaptotagmins, such as SYT6, share a common domain structure that includes a transmembrane domain and a cytoplasmic region composed of 2 C2 domains. Some synaptotagmins are involved in synaptic membrane fusion, while others have a more general function in endocytosis. For further information on synaptotagmins, see MIM 185605.[supplied by OMIM]

References

Further reading